Yevgeni Anatolyevich Koval (born 17 January 1973) is a former Russian football player.

Koval played in the Russian Premier League with FC Dynamo Stavropol.

References

1973 births
Living people
Soviet footballers
Russian footballers
FC Dynamo Stavropol players
Russian Premier League players
Association football defenders
FC Mashuk-KMV Pyatigorsk players